Eduardo Sergio Elsztain (born January 26, 1960) is a prominent Argentine businessman who is his country's largest real-estate developer. According to The Jerusalem Post, Elsztain "stands atop Argentina's largest business empire, the country's leader in real estate and agriculture, which he built with his own two hands."

He is the chairman of Inversiones y Representaciones S.A. (IRSA), Argentina's largest real estate company, which is listed on the New York Stock Exchange; of CRESUD, a leading agri-business company that operates in Argentina, Bolivia, Paraguay, and Uruguay and is listed on the NASDAQ; of BrasilAgro (Companhia Brasileira de Propriedades Agrícolas), which is also on the NYSE; and of the public–private partnership Banco Hipotecario, Argentina's leading mortgage bank in which Elsztain is the largest private shareholder.

Through IRSA, Elsztain runs most of the shopping malls in Argentina.

Early life and education
Eduardo Sergio Elsztain was born in Buenos Aires in 1960. His grandfather, Isaac Elsztain, had left Russia in 1917, after the Russian Revolution, and settled in Argentina, where he purchased various properties. He founded Inversiones y Representaciones S.A. ("Investments and Brokerage, Inc," or, IRSA) in 1943 as an independent realty firm. The younger Elsztain graduated from the Buenos Aires National College, a prestigious public secondary school, and enrolled in the University of Buenos Aires School of Economics, though in 1981, upon the death of his uncle, who had been managing the family realty, he dropped out of university to manage the firm, which was struggling at the time.

Elsztain married psychologist Mariana Carmona in 1991. They have had four children and live in the neighborhood of Belgrano, where he has lived all his life.

A devout Jew, Elsztain built a synagogue next door to his home. His sister lives in Israel (Elsztain also has two brothers who serve in executive positions within the group, as does a cousin). Elsztain is a follower of the Lubavitcher Rebbe, who "advised him to sell his holdings on the stock exchange and focus on real estate, a suggestion that turned out to be well timed."

Career

Mindlin and Soros partnerships
Elsztain took over IRSA after returning to Buenos Aires "from a volunteer year in Israel." He "required financial assistance from his Jewish Argentine friend, Marcelo Mindlin, in order to raise $120,000 to acquire IRSA shares." When Elsztain took control of IRSA, it was worth only $100,000.

Several of Elsztain's firms, including Cresud, Grupo Dolphin S.A., and Alto Palermo S.A., were founded in partnership with Mindlin. Their business partnership ended in 2003.

Elsztain lived in New York in 1989-90. During that period, in 1990, he "talked his way into a meeting with the legendary investor George Soros," according to Haaretz. Another source states that Elsztain met Soros "through contacts...in the Jewish community in Buenos Aires." In any event, Soros "was persuaded to let the ambitious young man manage $10 million for him," which Elsztain did "with great success." Speaking to The Jerusalem Post in 2013, Elsztain himself described "the moment...that changed his career" as follows: "I somehow managed to land a meeting with George Soros, a very rich man. We talked for an hour or so, and then he asked me how much money I thought I could handle. I told him I could manage $10 million, and he said 'Okay, no problem!'" Soros told the Post that Elsztain, despite his youth and inexperience, "knew when to sell and when to buy." This encounter precipitated Elsztain's quick "leap from utter anonymity to Argentina's business elite."

Soros became a leading investor in IRSA. The partnership with Soros became profitable for both parties, as the Argentine economy recovered during the 1990s from the severe stagflation of the previous decade. Within four years Elsztain had raised $110 million and acquired "office buildings and shopping centers in Argentina, including the Alto Palermo Shopping Mall." Elsztain's meeting with Soros has been described as the turning point in his career.  He has been called "Soros' golden boy." In 1992-94, Soros helped Elsztain gain control of Cresud, a leading landowner of prime pampas agricultural land, and served as his partner in the firm for many years. IRSA entered the international equity markets with Soros's backing in 1994. Losses stemming from the economic crisis that began in 1998 led the Soros Fund Management to divest most of its IRSA interests by late 1999. In total, Elsztain worked for over a decade with Soros.

In addition to Soros, Elsztain has also worked closely with U.S. real estate magnate Sam Zell, U.S. investment fund honcho Michael Steinhardt, and Hollywood mogul Edgar Bronfman. His close friends and business partners have included Clarisa Lifsic, who chairs Banco Hipotecario, and Saúl Zang, the lawyer for his companies.

Acquisitions
IRSA became a leading local real-estate development firm during the 1990s, purchasing 13 up-market Buenos Aires office buildings and a leading local shopping-mall developer, Alto Palermo S.A. (APSA). Through APSA, the group purchased important tourist assets such as the Llao Llao Hotel, a Bariloche mountain resort privatized in 1997, and a number of shopping malls, including Abasto Shopping (Buenos Aires), Alto Avellaneda (Avellaneda), Alto NOA (Salta), Alto Rosario (Rosario), Buenos Aires Design (Buenos Aires), Shopping Córdoba (Córdoba), Dot Baires Shopping (Buenos Aires), Mendoza Plaza (Mendoza), Paseo Alcorta (Buenos Aires), Patio Bullrich (Buenos Aires), Patio Olmos (Córdoba), Soleil Factory (Boulogne). The Dot Baires shopping mall in Buenos Aires is the largest in Argentina. Alto Palermo SA also has a subsidiary, Tarshop SA, that issues a credit card, Tarjeta Shopping. IRSA now holds 12 percent of Tarshop. It also owns 10 percent of the Argentine real estate firm TGLT.

The strong recovery in the Argentine economy after 2002 then fostered growth into the mortgage-lending sector, with the purchase of 28% of the formerly state owned Banco Hipotecario, and among its shopping centers, which, as the source of half of IRSA's revenues, boosted the firm's income; in 2008, it developed Dot Baires, a 190,000m² (2 million ft²) shopping center and the largest building of its kind in Argentina. Elsztain reportedly "did a good job of exploiting the real estate boom in Argentina" from 2006-2010. During this period IRSA's share price rose 155 percent and the firm came to be worth more than half a billion dollars. Between July 2011 and July 2012, IRSA netted $61 million. IRSA now owns most of the shopping malls in Argentina, and also several iconic buildings and hotels.

As of September 2012, Elsztain had purchased several businesses in Brazil and, more recently, in Israel and the United States. In 2010, IRSA bought 11 percent of Hersha Hospitality Trust, which owns 77 U.S. hotels. As of 2012, IRSA owned 2000 hotel rooms in New York City.

IRSA bought 30% of New York's Lipstick Building (885 Third Avenue) in 2007, and in November 2010 increased his stake to 49%. His close friend Rabbi Yoshiyahu Pinto "reportedly brokered the deal in which Elsztain bought the Lipstick Building in Manhattan from Ilan Ben Dov, as a result of which Elsztain became the partner of another businessman close to Pinto − Jacky Ben Zaken." It was also Pinto who arranged for him to meet Nochi Dankner and who mediated discussions of the Ganden acquisition of Israel's IDB Group.

Elzstain owns the Llao Llao Hotel in the tourist resort of San Carlos de Bariloche in Río Negro Province, Argentina. He also owns property on the resort island of Isla Victoria in Lake Nahuel Huapi. In addition, he owns the Iaacob House Hostel in Buenos Aires, which "offers Israeli travelers lodgings in the capital at a fair price − as long as they comply with the policy of segregated rooms for men and women." In May 2010, IRSA made an offer to buy Telecom Italia's share of Telecom Argentina. According to one source, "IRSA is recognized worldwide as the Argentina company that ensures the best business in real estate."

Elsztain was a Trustee and Member of Acquisition Committee of Hersha Hospitality Trust from 2009 to 2011, and a Trustee of Hersha Hospitality Trust from August 2009 to September 12, 2011. He has served as an Executive Officer of Golden Minerals Company and as President of IRSA Investments and Representations Inc.

La Nación noted in 2005 that while Elsztain, at that time, enjoyed a considerable "degree of recognition and influence...internationally," he keeps a "low profile" in Argentina. As of 2005, Elsztain's brother Alejandro was managing IRSA and Cresud, his brother Daniel was in charge of the malls, and their cousin Fernando was managing the real estate.

According to Haaretz, "IRSA's major enterprises have relied on Elsztain's ability to spot the potential in dilapidated properties and renovate them. In the Puerto Madero district of Buenos Aires − an entire neighborhood that was built on the ruins of the city's old docks − IRSA built commercial and office space. In the center of the city, Elsztain saw the potential in the ravaged Abasto de Buenos Aires building, a wholesale market that stood empty and mice-infested. Retaining its historic facade, he built the Abasto Shopping Center over the foundations. Another example is Isla Demarchi, where Elsztain was one of the parties behind the construction of a commercial and office complex on an artificial island that extended the area of Buenos Aires into the Río de la Plata."

Current business activities
Elsztain is Chairman, CEO, and a Member of Executive Committee of IRSA, titles he has held since 1991. He is Chairman and a Member of the Executive Committee of Cresud, titles he has held since 1994. He is Chairman and President of the Executive Committee of Alto Palermo S.A., titles he has held since 1994. He is Chairman and Director of Banco Hipotecario SA (of which he has also served as Vice Chairman), titles he has held since 1999. He is also the Chairman of the Board and a Director of Brasilagro Companhia Brasileira de Propriedades Agrícolas. He owns IRSA, Cresud, and Hipotecario through his holding company IFISA.
Today Elsztain controls Cresud, of which he owns 38 percent, and owns 65 percent of IRSA through Cresud. IRSA is traded on the New York and Buenos Aires stock exchanges. As of 2013, Cresud was trading on NASDAQ at a value of $370 million. "Except for its holdings in IRSA," according to Haaretz, Cresud "is an agriculture business of only moderate profitability." Today Cresud owns 23 million square meters of land and "focuses on acquiring grain and cattle farms, and on milk production." During the first decade of the 21st century it was named Argentina's largest meat and grain manufacturer, but it has since sold off some of its farms.

Elsztain is one of Argentina's leading owner of cereal and soy fields and an influential member of the country's four rural organizations, Sociedad Rural, Federación Agraria Argentina, Confederaciones Rurales Argentinas, and Coninagro.  In addition to its holdings in IRSA, Cresud holds 36 percent of BrasilAgro, which operates in Argentina, Brazil, Bolivia and Paraguay. BrasilArgo controls APSA, a Buenos Aires real-estate company that is traded on the stock exchange and that is valued at $50 million. Cresud also holds 30 percent of Argentina's largest mortgage bank, Banco Hipotecario.

Moreover, Elsztain is Chairman of the Australian mining company Austral Gold, in which he is also a shareholder; the company mines metals in South America as well. Elsztain also owns 85 percent of the Dolphin Fund, which he founded, and to which Cresud pays 10 percent of its profit under a special consultancy agreement.

In addition, Elsztain has been Non-Executive Chairman of Austral Gold Limited since 2007. He is the Chairman of SAMAP (Sociedad Anónima Mercado del Abasto Proveedor). He has been the Chairman of Alto Palermo S.A. since 2000 and its Director since 1994. He also serves as the Vice-Chairman of E-Commerce Latina S.A. He is the President and Chairman of the Board of Consultores Asset Management, which he founded. He is also employed at TGLT Consultores Ventures, has served as the President at Consultores Asociados since 1989, and is Chairman of the Board of SAPSA, Hoteles Argentinos, and Consultores Venture Capital Uruguay S.A. He has served as Director of 382296 since 2005.

In 2014 he became a member of the Board of Director of Shufersal Ltd, Discount Investment Corporation Limited, Koor Industries Limited, IDB Holding Corporation Limited, Property & Building Corp. Ltd, and YPF S.A.

Ganden Holdings deal
It was reported in September 2012 that Elsztain had arranged to invest up to $100 million in Nochi Dankner's Ganden Holdings, which controlled the IDB group until its collapse a year later; at the time, Ganden owned a 45.87% stake in the company. IDB is the largest corporation in Israel, with interests in finance, insurance, real estate development, manufacturing, and telecommunications, including controlling shares in Cellcom and Super-Sol, and has assets totaling $35 billion.

According to Haaretz, Elsztain was "the only one willing to invest in Ganden...Everyone else, it seems, is demanding that Dankner pay the price for his irresponsible financial conduct, which has seen IDB and its pyramid of companies engulfed in debt." Elzstain initially invested $25 million for 10% of Ganden and for an option up to the end of February 2013 to spend up to $75 million for a total of 30.8% of the company; the deal valued Ganden at over a billion dollars. This was Elsztain's first business venture in Israel.

Elsztain made his initial investment in Ganden through his public companies. "IRSA's annual reports make no mention of Ganden or of any investment in Israel," noted Haaretz, "but they do mention that, in September–October 2012, the company invested $25 million in the Dolphin Investment Fund − through which the investment in Ganden was handled." Dankner resisted Elsztain's effort to take control of IDB, however, and in December 2013, Elsztain and his partner, Moti Ben-Moshe, won a bid to control the firm. Judge Eitan Orenstein, reported Jerusalem Online, "rejected the claims of Nochi Dankner, who tried to convince the court that the transfer of control of the giant holding company from his hands was tainted by a conflict of interests. Orenstein stated that 'his arguments are merely disingenuous.' The judge approved the creditors' arrangement and determined that for now Eduardo Elsztain and Moti Ben-Moshe control the country's largest corporation."

Other activities
Elsztain is an annual conferee at the World Economic Forum in Davos, and is active in Jewish philanthropic causes as the prime Argentine supporter of and fundraiser for the World Jewish Congress (WJC) and for Taglit-Birthright Israel, and as the President of Chabad Argentina. He is also President of Hillel Argentina and Taglit Birthright Argentina. Close to leading American Jewish executive Edgar Bronfman, he was named Treasurer of the WJC in 2005, and then served as chairman of its Governing Board (the group's second-highest post) from 2009 to 2013. In May 2013, he was elected a vice-president of the World Jewish Congress and became chairman of the new WJC Business Advisory Council.

Elsztain currently serves on the Board of Directors of Endeavor, an international non-profit development organization that finds and supports high-impact entrepreneurs in emerging markets. He is also the President of Fundación IRSA and Museo de los Niños del Abasto.

He is a member of Argentine Enterprise Association (AEA), of the Board of Directors of the Buenos Aires Stock Exchange, and of the Group of 50, and he has attended the G20 Business Summits. He is the chairman of Fundación Irsa, an educational foundation; and a member of Endeavor, which aids entrepreneurs in emerging countries.

Political connections
Elsztain stated that the late President Néstor Kirchner "always had an open ear for concerns among the Jewish community, not just in Argentina, but across the continent," and that he had "often interceded, for the benefit of our communities, with fellow statesmen in other countries."

The media took note of a May 2008 meeting between Elsztain and President Cristina Fernández de Kirchner that lasted "more than an hour." Elsztain reportedly became a regular visitor to the presidential offices at the Casa Rosada. In April 2013, when one of Elsztain's malls was accused of exacerbating nearby flooding, a report indicated that Elsztain planned to raise the matter at a meeting with Kirchner. One source has identified Elsztain as "a strategic ally of the government of Cristina Fernández de Kirchner." His business entities receive financial subsidies from ANSES, the Argentine government's social insurance agency, through an affordable home mortgage program called PRO.CRE.AR (Programa Crédito Argentino). Through Banco Hipotecario, Elsztain and the government jointly run housing construction programs.

In August 2012, Elzstain began building a large shopping mall, Distrito Arcos, in the neighborhood of Palermo in Buenos Aires, without applying for authorization from the city's legislature or going through any of the legal steps necessary for construction projects. The opening was suspended by court order for one year, and ultimately took place in November 2014.

When the Argentine government introduced Resolution 125, Cresud SA captured $288 million in the market to finalize a capital expansion. "The Kirchner administration," reported Haaretz in 2013, "recently initiated reform in the construction industry, with the aim of encouraging construction of residential apartments. Among other things, the reform includes mortgage-financing breaks for citizens. The fact that this move will benefit the bank Elsztain controls has not escaped the media's notice." In addition, Elsztain has also been attacked by the Kirchners' opponents because of the tax breaks given by the government to his mining firm, Austral Gold.

Meeting with Chávez
Along with Jewish leaders Ronald S. Lauder and Jack Terpins, Elsztain met with Hugo Chávez in August 2008 to discuss anti-Semitism in Venezuela and the welfare of the country's Jewish community. Elsztain later said in a radio interview that the meeting was "amazing" and "better than we expected," and praised Chávez's willingness to listen to the concerns of the Jewish community was "remarkable." Venezuelan Jews were critical of this verdict, however, with former Culture Minister Paulina Gamus complaining that the meeting had come during an election campaign and had made it seem as if Chávez had received the imprimatur of the Jewish community. She noted that 300 gentile Venezuelan intellectuals had denounced Chávez as an anti-Semite, while Lauder, Elsztain, and Terpins, on behalf of the Jewish community, were giving Chávez "a good-conduct medal."

References

1960 births
Living people
Argentine Jews
Argentine people of Russian-Jewish descent
Businesspeople from Buenos Aires
University of Buenos Aires alumni
Argentine philanthropists
Jewish philanthropists